Seventh Heaven is a poetry collection by Patti Smith, published in 1972.

Contents 
 "Seventh Heaven"
 "Sally"
 "Jeanne Darc"
 "Renee Falconetti"
 "A Fire of Unknown Origin"
 "Edie Sedgwick"
 "Crystal"
 "Marianne Faithfull"
 "Girl Trouble"
 "Cocaine"
 "Judith"
 "Fantasy"
 "Marilyn Miller"
 "Mary Jane"
 "Amelia Earhart I"
 "Amelia Earhart II"
 "Linda"
 "Death by Water"
 "Celine"
 "Dog Dream"
 "Female"
 "Longing"

Notes

External links 
 
 Patti Smith early poetry. Oxford Literary Review

American poetry collections
Poetry by Patti Smith
1972 poetry books
Books by Patti Smith